Voivodeship road 877 in Poland is a voivodeship road linking Naklik with Szklary.

Important settlements along the Voivodeship road 877
 Naklik (road 863)
 Kuryłówka
 Leżajsk (road 77), (road 875)
 Żołynia
 Wola Mała (highway A4)
 Łańcut (road 94), (road 881)
 Dylągówka (road 878)
 Szklary (road 835)

877